Eddy van Ijzendoorn (born 21 March 1985) is a Dutch professional cyclo-cross cyclist.

He competed multiple times at the elite level and won a junior silver medal at the 2003 UCI Cyclo-cross World Championships.

He is the brother of Rik van IJzendoorn.

Van IJzendoorn is a national and world masters champion.

Major results

2002–2003
 2nd  UCI Junior World Championships
 Junior Superprestige
2nd Sint-Michielsgestel
2nd Harnes
 3rd National Junior Championships
2003–2004
 3rd National Under-23 Championships
2004–2005
 2nd National Under-23 Championships
2005–2006
 Under-23 Superprestige
2nd Hoogstraten
 3rd National Under-23 Championships
 3rd Nacht van Woerden
2006–2007
 UCI Under-23 World Cup
2nd Kalmthout
 3rd Krawatencross Under-23
2008–2009
 1st Sint-Michielsgestel
2009–2010
 2nd Openingsveldrit van Harderwijk
2010–2011
 3rd National Championships
2013–2014
 3rd Rucphen

References

External links

Living people
Dutch male cyclists
People from Neder-Betuwe
1985 births
People from Tiel
Cyclo-cross cyclists
Cyclists from Gelderland
21st-century Dutch people